Michael II the Stammerer (died in 829) was a Byzantine emperor.

Michael II may also refer to:
 Pope Michael II of Alexandria, ruled 849–851
 Michael II of Duklja, King of Duklja, c. 1101-1102
 Michael II Komnenos Doukas of Epirus (died in 1266/68)
 Michael II of Antioch, Syriac Orthodox Patriarch of Antioch (ruled in 1292–1312)
 Patriarch Michael II Fadel, ruled in 1793–1795
 Michael II, Grand Duke of Russia (1878–1918)
 Michael II, Duke of Braganza (1853–1927)

See also
 Michael (disambiguation)